Viasat Plus was a television channel established to entertain audience between the ages of 15–80.  The channel broadcast re-runs of sit-coms shown on TV3 earlier and soap operas. Viasat Plus was broadcast in Norway, and was replaced by ZTV in 2002. In Denmark there is a similar channel TV3+.

Nowadays, Viasat+ (with the symbol, not letters) is the name of Viasat's Satellite Dish Recording system that can record programs which are broadcast by Viasat (similar to TiVo).

Defunct television channels in Norway
Television channels and stations established in 2000
Television channels and stations disestablished in 2002